Sobir Kamolovich Kamolov (in Cyrillic Uzbek: Собир Камолович Камолов ; in Russian: Сабир Камалович Камалов Sabir Kamalovich Kamalov) (2 May 1910, in Tashkent – 6 June 1990) was a Soviet politician. He served as the tenth First Secretary of the Communist Party of the Uzbek SSR from December 1957 until March 1959.

References
World Statesmen - Uzbekistan

1910 births
1990 deaths
Politicians from Tashkent
Party leaders of the Soviet Union
First Secretaries of the Communist Party of Uzbekistan
Heads of government of the Uzbek Soviet Socialist Republic
Second convocation members of the Supreme Soviet of the Soviet Union
Third convocation members of the Supreme Soviet of the Soviet Union
Fourth convocation members of the Supreme Soviet of the Soviet Union
Fifth convocation members of the Supreme Soviet of the Soviet Union
Recipients of the Order of Lenin

Recipients of the Order of the Red Banner of Labour
Recipients of the Order of the Red Star